Women They Talk About is a 1928 American comedy drama film directed by Lloyd Bacon and starring Irene Rich and Audrey Ferris. It was a part-talkie Vitaphone film with talking, music, and sound effects sequences and produced and distributed by Warner Bros. It is considered to be a lost film.

Cast
 Irene Rich as Irne Mervin Hughes
 Audrey Ferris as Audrey Hughes
 William Collier, Jr. as Steve Harrison
 Anders Randolf as John Harrison
 Claude Gillingwater as Grandfather Mervin
 Jack Santoro as The Frameup Man
 John Miljan as policeman

Box office
According to Warner Bros. records, the film earned $366,000 domestically and $68,000 foreign.

See also
 List of lost films

References

External links

 
 
 Press and lobby advertising materials

1928 films
Warner Bros. films
1920s English-language films
Films directed by Lloyd Bacon
Lost American films
American black-and-white films
American comedy-drama films
1928 comedy-drama films
1928 lost films
Lost comedy-drama films
1920s American films